1251 Hedera is a background asteroid from the central regions of the asteroid belt, approximately  in diameter. It was discovered on 25 January 1933, by German astronomer Karl Reinmuth at the Heidelberg-Königstuhl State Observatory in southwest Germany. The asteroid was named for the climbing plant Hedera, commonly known as "ivy".

Orbit and classification 

Hedera is a non-family asteroid from the main belt's background population. It orbits the Sun in the central asteroid belt at a distance of 2.3–3.1 AU once every 4 years and 6 months (1,636 days; semi-major axis of 2.72 AU). Its orbit has an eccentricity of 0.16 and an inclination of 6° with respect to the ecliptic. The body's observation arc begins at Heidelberg, the night after its official discovery observation.

Naming 

This minor planet was named after the evergreen woody plant Hedera ("ivy") a genus of climbing or ground-creeping woody plants in the aralia family (ivy family). The  was mentioned in The Names of the Minor Planets by Paul Herget in 1955.

Reinmuth's flowers 

Due to his many discoveries, Karl Reinmuth submitted a large list of 66 newly named asteroids in the early 1930s. This list also contained a sequence of 28 asteroids, starting with 1054 Forsytia, that were all named after plants, in particular flowering plants (also see list of minor planets named after animals and plants).

Physical characteristics 

Hedera is an E-type and X-type asteroid in the Tholen and SMASS classification, respectively.

Rotation period 

Several rotational lightcurves of Hedera have been obtained from photometric observations since 2007. Best-rated lightcurve by Julian Oey at Kingsgrove and Leura observatories, Australia, gave a rotation period of 19.9000 hours with a consolidated brightness amplitude between 0.41 and 0.61 magnitude.

Spin axis 

Modeled photometric data from the Lowell Photometric Database (LPD) and the robotic BlueEye600 Observatory, gave a concurring period of 19.9020 hours, Both studies determined two spin axes of (124.0°, −70.0°) and (266.0°, −62.0°), as well as (271.0°, −53.0°) and (115.0°, −62.0°) in ecliptic coordinates (λ, β).

Diameter and albedo 

According to the survey carried out by the NEOWISE mission of NASA's Wide-field Infrared Survey Explorer, Hedera measures 13.239 kilometers in diameter and its surface has an albedo of 0.636.

The Collaborative Asteroid Lightcurve Link assumes a standard albedo for carbonaceous asteroids of 0.057 and consequently calculates a larger diameter of 44.22 kilometers based on an absolute magnitude of 10.50.

References

External links 
 Lightcurve Database Query (LCDB), at www.minorplanet.info
 Dictionary of Minor Planet Names, Google books
 Asteroids and comets rotation curves, CdR – Geneva Observatory, Raoul Behrend
 Discovery Circumstances: Numbered Minor Planets (1)-(5000) – Minor Planet Center
 
 

001251
Discoveries by Karl Wilhelm Reinmuth
Named minor planets
001251
001251
19330125